Ernest O. Carpenter, born April 10, 1907, at Sutton, West Virginia, died January 23, 1997, was a famous American fiddle player, 1988 winner of the Vandalia Award, West Virginia's highest folklife honor, at the annual Vandalia Gathering.  He is interred near Sutton, West Virginia.

References

Musicians from West Virginia
People from Sutton, West Virginia
Southern old-time fiddlers
1907 births
1997 deaths
20th-century American musicians